Days May Come and Days May Go is a compilation album by the British hard rock band Deep Purple, released in 2000 (see 2000 in music).

It contains impressive rehearsals and lengthy improvised jams undertaken in June 1975, at Robert Simon's Pirate Sound studios. Recorded soon after Tommy Bolin had joined the band, the sound-desk recordings feature ideas and tracks that would eventually become the Come Taste the Band album.

The California Rehearsals: June 1975

Track listing 
 "Owed to G (Instrumental)" (Tommy Bolin) – 3:31
 "If You Love Me Woman" (Bolin, David Coverdale) – 10:06
 "The Orange Juice Song" (Coverdale, Jon Lord) – 3:33
 "I Got Nothing for You" (Bolin, Coverdale, Glenn Hughes, Lord) – 12:52
 "Statesboro Blues" (Blind Willie McTell) – 5:55
 "Dance to the Rock & Roll" (Bolin, Coverdale, Hughes, Lord, Ian Paice) – 11:01
 "Drifter (Rehearsal Sequence)" (Bolin, Coverdale) – 3:28
 "Drifter (Version 1)" (Bolin, Coverdale) – 4:02
 "The Last of the Long Jams" (Bolin, Coverdale, Hughes, Lord, Paice) – 9:04
 "Untitled Song" (impromptu version of "I Got You Babe" by Sonny Bono) – 1:05

Personnel 
Tommy Bolin: Guitars, vocals.
David Coverdale: Vocals.
Glenn Hughes: Bass guitar, vocals.
Jon Lord: Keyboards, organ, mini moog, vocals.
Ian Paice: Drums, percussion.

Production 
Martin Birch: Producer.
Robert Simon: Engineer.
Nick Watson: Sound Replacements.
Simon Robinson: Coordination, Liner Notes.

1420 Beachwood Drive: The 1975 Rehearsals, Volume 2

Track listing 
 "Drifter (Version 2)" (Bolin, Coverdale) – 3:41
 "Sail Away Riff" (Blackmore, Coverdale) – 2:50
 "You Keep on Moving (take 1)" (Coverdale, Hughes) – 8:18
 "Pirate Blues (jam)" (Bolin, Coverdale, Hughes, Lord, Paice) – 6:45
 "Say You Love Me" (Coverdale) – 7:25

Personnel 
David Coverdale: Vocals
Tommy Bolin: Guitars, vocals
Jon Lord: Keyboards, organ
Ian Paice: Drums, percussion
Glenn Hughes: Bass guitar, vocals

References

Albums produced by Martin Birch
2000 compilation albums
Deep Purple compilation albums
Purple Records compilation albums
Victor Entertainment compilation albums